Matías Nicolás García (born 22 July 1996) is a professional footballer who plays as a defensive midfielder for Maltese Premier League club Floriana. Born in Argentina, he plays for the Malta national team.

Club career
García is a youth product of Sarmiento La Banda and Belgrano. From Belgrano, he moved to Malta with Senglea Athletic in 2017. He transferred to Floriana in 2019, and helped them win the 2019–20 Maltese Premier League in his debut season with them.

International career
García was born in Argentina, and was naturalized via merit to Malta after spending 5 years in the country. He was called up to the Malta national football team for UEFA Nations League matches in June 2022. He debuted with Malta in a friendly 1–0 loss to Venezuela on 1 June 2022.

Honours
Floriana
 Maltese Premier League: 2019–20
 Maltese FA Trophy: 2021–22

References

External links
 
 

1996 births
Living people
People from La Banda
People with acquired Maltese citizenship
Maltese footballers
Malta international footballers
Argentine footballers
Argentine emigrants to Malta
Maltese people of Argentine descent
Association football midfielders
Senglea Athletic F.C. players
Floriana F.C. players
Maltese Premier League players
Argentine expatriate footballers
Argentine expatriates in Malta
Expatriate footballers in Malta